The 1996 European Wrestling Championships were held in the Greco-Romane and the men's Freestyle style in Budapest 21 – 30 March 1996; the women's  Freestyle style in Oslo  1 – 3 June 1996 .

Medal table

Medal summary

Men's freestyle

Men's Greco-Roman

Women's freestyle

References

External links
Fila's official championship website

Europe
W
W
European Wrestling Championships
Euro
Euro
Sports competitions in Budapest
Sports competitions in Oslo
1996 in European sport